Peter Humphry Greenwood FRS FIBiol (21 April 1927 – 3 March 1995) was an English ichthyologist.  Humphry married fellow student Marjorie George (1924 – 2006) in 1950. He was elected a Fellow of the Royal Society in 1985.  He was known for his work on the species flocks of cichlids in the African Great Lakes, and for studies of the phylogeny and systematics of teleosts.

Tribute
The cichlid fish Diplotaxodon greenwoodi     is named for him. 
Also Brachyaetoides greenwoodi Bonde, 2008 is named for him.
As is Enteromius greenwoodi (Poll 1967).

See also
:Category:Taxa named by Humphry Greenwood

References

External links

1927 births
1995 deaths
Fellows of the Royal Society
English ichthyologists
20th-century British zoologists
Members of the Royal Swedish Academy of Sciences